William Cecil Slingsby (1849–1929) was an English mountain climber and alpine explorer from Carleton, North Yorkshire. Born in Bell Busk, near Gargrave, Yorkshire, Slingsby first visited Norway in 1872 and fell in love with the country. He has been called the discoverer of the Norwegian mountains, and the father of Norwegian mountaineering (insofar as he seems to be the first who actively pursued climbing in Norway and was the first person on several mountains). Together with Norway's early skilled mountain climber Kristian Bing (1862–1935), he is considered to have been a pioneer explorer of Jostedalsbreen, the largest glacier in continental Europe.

Slingsby is perhaps most famous for being the first on "Storen", or Store Skagastølstind ( in 1876, the third highest mountain in Norway. It was considered impossible to climb then, but Slingsby defied popular notion and climbed the mountain, for the last part alone. Slingsby also attempted to climb the 1392 metres tall and highly steep Stetind in Narvik, but his attempt ended up as a failure, as he never made it to the peak of the mountain. Slingsby would later describe this mountain as the ugliest one he had ever seen. 
His crossing of the  Keiser Pass, Norway, on skis in 1880 also helped inspire the sport of ski mountaineering.

He also spoke and wrote strongly about several other mountains for example Slogen. His classic book on climbing in Norway, Norway: the Northern Playground, was first published in 1904 and republished in 1941. A new edition was released in 2003. The latest edition was published in March 2014.

Slingsby was an honorary member of Norsk Tindeklub and of the Norwegian Trekking Association. He had five children; the youngest, Eleanor Winthrop Young, was herself a climber and a co-founder of the Pinnacle Club, a women's climbing association.

Cecil died  on 23 August 1929 in a nursing home at Hurstpierpoint, in East Sussex. He is buried in the churchyard at Carleton-in-Craven.

Selected works
 W.C. Slingsby Norway: the Northern Playground, 
 Norway, the northern playground; sketches of climbing and mountain exploration in Norway between 1872 and 1903. Publisher: D. Douglas Edinburgh, 1904

References

External links
 William Cecil Slingsby & Norway's 2000m Peaks
 Pioneering climber was a legend in his own lifetime - The Craven Herald & Pioneer (1 March 2012)
 Slingsby, William Cecil - The Oxford Dictionary of National Biography
 THIS YORKSHIRE MAN LED THE WAY TO THE HEIGHTS By Walt Unsworth

English mountain climbers
English explorers
1849 births
1929 deaths